Daniel Ivanov (born 4 November 1965) is a retired Bulgarian long jumper.

He became Bulgarian champion in 1989, and Bulgarian indoor champion in 1989, 1990 and 1993. He competed at the 1990 European Championships without reaching the final. 2001)</ref>

References

1965 births
Living people
Bulgarian male long jumpers
Doping cases in athletics
Bulgarian sportspeople in doping cases